The 1956 United States presidential election in South Carolina took place on November 6, 1956, as part of the 1956 United States presidential election. South Carolina voters chose 8 representatives, or electors, to the Electoral College, who voted for president and vice president.

Background
For six decades up to 1950 South Carolina had been a one-party state dominated by the Democratic Party. The Republican Party had been moribund due to the disfranchisement of blacks and the complete absence of other support bases as the Palmetto State completely lacked upland or German refugee whites opposed to secession. Between 1900 and 1948, no Republican presidential candidate ever obtained more than seven percent of the total presidential vote – a vote which in 1924 reached as low as 6.6 percent of the total voting-age population (or approximately 15 percent of the voting-age white population).

This absolute loyalty began to break down during World War II when Vice-Presidents Henry A. Wallace and Harry Truman began to realize that a legacy of discrimination against blacks was a threat to the United States' image abroad and its ability to win the Cold War against the radically egalitarian rhetoric of Communism. In the 1948 presidential election, Truman was backed by only 24 percent of South Carolina's limited electorate – most of that from the relatively few upcountry poor whites able to meet rigorous voting requirements – and state Governor Strom Thurmond won 71 percent, carrying every county except Anderson and Spartanburg. Despite Truman announcing as early as May 1950 that he would not run again for President in 1952, it had already become clear that South Carolina's rulers remained severely disenchanted with the national Democratic Party. Both Thurmond and former Governor James F. Byrnes would endorse national Republican nominee Dwight D. Eisenhower – who ran under an independent label in South Carolina – and Democratic nominee Adlai Stevenson II only won narrowly due to two- and three-to-one majorities in the poor white counties that had given substantial opposition to Thurmond in 1948.

During the first Eisenhower term, South Carolina’s whites who had supported him became extremely critical because Eisenhower was blamed for Brown v. Board of Education, whose requirement of desegregating the state’s schools was intolerable. Consequently, state leaders like Thurmond argued that the GOP could not be a useful tool for opposing civil rights, and most of the state’s Democrats endorsed Stevenson for his rematch with Eisenhower. Byrnes, however, obtained 35,000 petitions for an alternative slate of unpledged Democratic electors, which he naturally endorsed when ballot access was obtained for that slate.

Vote
In mid-October, the consensus among pollsters was that the state’s vote would be sharply split between the three slates, although polls just before election day suggested that Stevenson was likely to carry the state. Ultimately South Carolina was won by Adlai Stevenson (D–Illinois), running with Tennessee Senator Estes Kefauver by a more decisive margin than polls predicted. Stevenson gained 45.37 percent of the popular vote thanks to his continued dominance of the upcountry, whilst Eisenhower and the unpledged slate divided the lowcountry vote, with the unpledged slate finishing second with 29.45 percent and Eisenhower – this time running under the “Republican” banner – with 25.18 percent Wealthier whites left Eisenhower for the unpledged slate in large numbers, but unlike in 1952 when the small number of black voters strongly supported Stevenson, Eisenhower gained substantial, even majority, support from blacks able to vote in Charleston and Columbia.

The 1956 election in South Carolina marks the second of only three times in the 20th century that an incumbent president has finished third in any state. , this is the last time that a Republican has been elected president without carrying South Carolina, and the last time that Greenville County voted for a Democratic presidential candidate. It is also the last time that Lexington County was not carried by the Republican candidate.

Results

Results by county

Notes

References

South Carolina
1956
1956 South Carolina elections